R v Tang is decision of the High Court of Australia. 

It is notable as the first criminal conviction for a slavery offence in Australia. The case concerned an appeal the State of Victoria against Wei Tang, the operator of a Melbourne brothel. The case has been described by commentators as 'the most crucial test of the effectiveness of our criminal laws against … slavery ever to come before an Australian court'.

Facts 
Tang was convicted in 2006 of 5 counts of intentionally possessing a slave and 5 counts of intentionally exercising a power of ownership over a slave. She was sentenced to 10 years’ imprisonment, with a non-parole period of 6 years. The charges related to five women, all Thai nationals.

The Victorian Court of Appeal held that the judge's directions to the jury were inadequate, quashed the convictions and ordered that Tang be retried.

The prosecution was given special leave to appeal to the High Court. Tang was given special leave to cross appeal on the meaning and constitutional validity of section 270.3(1)(a) of the Criminal Code.

The majority of the High Court, Gleeson CJ, Gummow, Hayne, Heydon, Crennan and Kiefel JJ, upheld the prosecutions appeal, holding that the prosecution did not need to prove that Ms Tang knew or believed that the women were slaves. Tang's appeal on the meaning and validity of the legislation was dismissed. Kirby J dissented.

The matter was remitted to the Victorian Court of Appeal to consider Tang's appeal against her sentence. The Victorian Court of Appeal upheld her appeal against sentence and Tang was re-sentenced to 9 years’ imprisonment, with a non-parole period of 5 years.

Notes

References

High Court of Australia cases
Slavery in Australia
2008 in Australian law
2008 in case law
Australian criminal law